Andy Murray and Jamie Murray were the defending champions but decided to participate at Basel instead. The brothers Bob and Mike Bryan became the new champions, defeating Eric Butorac and Jean-Julien Rojer in the final.

Seeds

Draw

Draw

External links
 Main draw

Doubles